GameRankings was a video gaming review aggregator that was founded in 1999 and owned by CBS Interactive. It indexed over 315,000 articles relating to more than 14,500 video games. GameRankings was discontinued in December 2019, with its staff being merged with the similar aggregator Metacritic.

Rankings 

GameRankings collected and linked to (but did not host) reviews from other websites and magazines and averages specific ones. While hundreds of reviews may get listed, only the ones that GameRankings deemed notable were used for the average. Scores were culled from numerous American and European sources. The site used a percentage grade for all reviews in order to be able to calculate an average. However, because not all sites use the same scoring system (some rate out of 5 or 10, while others use a letter grade), GameRankings changed all other types of scores into percentages using a relatively straightforward conversion process.

When a game accumulated six total reviews, it was given a ranking compared to all other games in the database and a ranking compared to games on its console.

At the time of the site's closure in December 2019, seven games had an aggregate score of 97% or higher: Super Mario Galaxy, The Legend of Zelda: Ocarina of Time, Super Mario Odyssey, Super Mario Galaxy 2, The Legend of Zelda: Breath of the Wild, Grand Theft Auto IV, and Grand Theft Auto V.

Shutdown 
GameRankings was shut down and redirected to Metacritic, another review aggregator, on December 9, 2019.

References

External links 
 
 "High Scores Matter To Game Makers, Too", The Wall Street Journal, September 20, 2007.
 "Video games: Aiming to please?", StarTribune, June 7, 2008.
 "Things that suck about video game reviews", That Videogame Blog, April 2, 2008.
 "Do Review Scores Really Matter?", Dpad Magazine, June 11, 2010.

Defunct CBS Interactive websites
Internet properties established in 1999
Internet properties disestablished in 2019
Online game databases
Video game review aggregators